Nguyễn Hoàng Vương is a Vietnamese left-sided defender who plays for V-League club Navibank Sài Gòn. He made his debut for the Vietnam national football team in 2008.

References

1981 births
Living people
Vietnamese footballers
Vietnam international footballers
Footballers at the 2002 Asian Games
Navibank Sài Gòn FC players
Dong Thap FC players
Association football defenders
Asian Games competitors for Vietnam